Padfield v Minister of Agriculture, Fisheries and Food [1968] UKHL 1 is a United Kingdom administrative law case, concerning judicial review.

Facts
Padfield and other milk producers in the South East Region argued they should get more milk subsidies to reflect growing transport costs, and applied to court to compel the minister to appoint an investigation.

The Agricultural Marketing Act 1958 section 19 said a committee of the Milk Marketing Board can investigate "if the Minister so directs" after a complaint on a scheme's operation if it cannot be considered by a consumers' committee (subsection 3(b)), and if it reports a scheme is "contrary to the interests of consumers of the regulated products" or "any persons affected by the scheme" and is "not in the public interest" the minister can amend the scheme, revoke it or direct the board to rectify it (subsection 6).

There were eleven milk regions with different prices for milk, fixed depending on costs of transporting milk from producers to consumers. All milk producers had to sell their milk to the Milk Marketing Board. Differentials had been fixed a few years earlier and transport costs had changed.

The SE region argued the difference between it and the Far Western Region should be altered: this would incidentally affect other regions. Board members were elected by individual regions, so it was impossible for SE producers to get a majority for their proposals.

They asked the Minister of Agriculture, Fisheries and Food (Fred Peart) to appoint a committee of investigation, but he refused. They requested mandamus (specifically, a court order requiring the Minister to appoint the Committee).

Judgment

Court of Appeal
Diplock LJ and Russell LJ held the minister's discretion could not be challenged. Lord Denning MR dissented.

House of Lords
The House of Lords, reversing the Court of Appeal, held that a minister's discretion to refuse an investigation was subject to judicial review where a refusal would frustrate the policy of an Act. An order should be made to direct the minister to consider the complaint.

Lord Reid said:

Lord Upjohn said that if the minister

Lord Morris of Borth-y-Gest dissented.

See also
UK constitutional law

Notes

External links
 Brexit, Padfield, and the Benn Act

United Kingdom constitutional case law